College of Architecture and Planning may refer to:

Ball State University College of Architecture and Planning
University of Utah College of Architecture and Planning